Thomasville, North Carolina was home to several minor league baseball teams from 1937–1969.

The Thomasville Chair Makers joined the North Carolina State League in 1937 and became the Thomasville Tommies in 1939. They were an affiliate of the Cleveland Indians from 1940–1942. No team was fielded during World War II.

The Thomasville Dodgers (an affiliate of the Brooklyn Dodgers) took the field in 1945.

In 1948, the team name was changed to reflect both Thomasville and High Point, North Carolina. The new name, the High Point-Thomasville Hi-Toms operated continuously through 1958, switching to the Tar Heel League in 1953 and then the Carolina League in 1954.

No team existed until 1965 when the team reformed as the Thomasville Hi-Toms for two seasons in the Western Carolinas League. After one more season, they returned as a Kansas City Royals affiliate for 1968 and 1969 in the Carolina League.

Since 1999, a new version of the team has played in the Coastal Plain League as a collegiate summer baseball team.

Notable alumni
Baseball Hall of Fame alumni

 Eddie Mathews (1948) Inducted, 1978

Notable alumni

 Curt Flood (1956) 3 x MLB All-Star
 Dallas Green (1957) Manager: 1980 World Series Champion Philadelphia Phillies
 Jack McKeon (1968, MGR) Manager: 2003 World Series Champion Florida Marlins
 Jim Rooker (1969)
 Al Rosen (1942) 4 x MLB All-Star; 1953 AL Most Valuable Player
 Gene Stephens (1951)
 Sammy Taylor (1950)

References

External links
Baseball Reference

Defunct minor league baseball teams
Kansas City Royals minor league affiliates
Brooklyn Dodgers minor league affiliates
Detroit Tigers minor league affiliates
Minnesota Twins minor league affiliates
Cincinnati Reds minor league affiliates
Philadelphia Phillies minor league affiliates
Boston Red Sox minor league affiliates
Boston Braves minor league affiliates
Cleveland Guardians minor league affiliates
Defunct Carolina League teams
Defunct baseball teams in North Carolina
1937 establishments in North Carolina
1969 disestablishments in North Carolina
Baseball teams established in 1937
Baseball teams disestablished in 1969
Thomasville, North Carolina
Professional baseball teams in North Carolina
Tar Heel League teams